Emsbüren is a municipality in the Emsland district, Lower Saxony, Germany. It is situated on the river Ems, approx. 15 km south of Lingen, and 15 km northwest of Rheine.

It has a railway station: Leschede.

Personalities 
 Willi Heeks (1922-1996), German automobile racing driver
 René Tebbel (born 1969), German showjumper

References

Emsland